Female biography was identified and named by Mary Hays (1759–1843) as a discrete empirical category of knowledge production and analysis while researching figures for the first Enlightenment prosopography of women, Female Biography; Or, memoirs of Illustrious and Celebrated Women, of all Ages and Countries (R. Phillips, 1803) in six volumes.

The first American edition came in 1807, arranged as three volumes and with minor typographical corrections (Birch & Small, Philadelphia). A new version of the encyclopedia was published again in six volumes in 2013 and 2014, as part of The Chawton House Library Series Memoirs of Women Writers (Part II: volumes 5–7; Part III, volumes 8–10; Pickering & Chatto, London). The Chawton House Library Edition (or CHLE) was edited by Gina Luria Walker, produced by a collaborative of contemporary scholars representing over 100 institutions in 18 countries and four continents, and contains new annotations and research that contextualize Hays's original sources of information.

This list of women collects all 300 figures included in Female Biography. Approximately 100 of the subjects listed here were also included in Judy Chicago's 1979 art installation The Dinner Party, either with a place setting at the table or with a ceramic tile in the Heritage Floor.

The names in the list below appear as they were spelled and alphabetized by Hays for the original publication. Hays grouped some subjects together in a single entry (resulting in a total count of 294 entries, but 300 subjects), indicated below with asterisks, all of which have been separately identified by scholars working on the modern edition.

Notes

References 
 Hays, Mary. Female Biography; or Memoirs of Illustrious and Celebrated Women of all Ages and Countries (6 volumes). London: R. Phillips, 1803.
 Hays, Mary, and Gina Luria Walker. Female Biography; or, Memoirs of Illustrious and Celebrated Women, of All Ages and Countries (1803). Chawton House Library Series: Women's Memoirs, ed. Gina Luria Walker, Memoirs of Women Writers Part II. London: Pickering & Chatto, 2013. Memoirs of Women Writers Part III. London: Pickering & Chatto, 2014.
 Walker, Gina Luria. "Mary Hays." Project Continua (2014)

External links
 Full text of all three volumes available online at Hathi Trust

Female Biography
Biographical dictionaries
Female Biography
Lists of women